9th Gaumee Film Awards ceremony, honored the best Maldivian films released in 2017 and 2018. The ceremony was held on 15 November 2019.

Winners and nominees

Main awards
Nominees were announced on 8 November 2020.

Technical awards

Special awards

Most wins
Vishka - 6
Dhevansoora - 4

See also
 Gaumee Film Awards

References

Gaumee Film Awards
2019 film awards
2019 in the Maldives
November 2019 events in Asia